Reggie Torian (born 22 April 1975) is an American hurdler.

He finished eighth at the 1998 World Cup and won a silver medal in 60 metres hurdles at the 1999 World Indoor Championships.

His personal best time for the 110 meter hurdles is 13.03 seconds, achieved in June 1998 in New Orleans.

External links

1975 births
Living people
American male hurdlers
Goodwill Games medalists in athletics
Competitors at the 1998 Goodwill Games